Osborne is a railway point and unincorporated place in geographic Osborne Township in the Unorganized North Part of Nipissing District in Northeastern Ontario, Canada. It was created during the construction of the Ontario Northland Railway in the early 20th century. Osborne is located on the railway line between the railway point of Diver to the north and the dispersed rural community of Jocko to the south. It has one railway siding.

Osborne is also along Black Duck Creek, a tributary of the Jocko River, in the Saint Lawrence River drainage basin, and is bordered on the east side, but is not part of, the northwest part of Jocko Rivers Provincial Park.

References

Communities in Nipissing District